Karns City High School is  located in Karns City, Pennsylvania.  It is part of the Karns City Area School District. The school serves students residing in Butler County, Clarion County, and Armstrong County, Pennsylvania. The boroughs of Chicora, East Brady, Fairview, Karns City, Petrolia, and Bruin, as well as the townships of Parker, Fairview, Donegal, Perry, Sugarcreek, Brady's Bend, and Brady are within Karns City School District boundaries. The Principals are Dr. Michael Stimac and Mrs. Brenda Knoll. The school colors are purple and gold. The school mascot is the Gremlin.

References

External links
 

Public high schools in Pennsylvania
Schools in Butler County, Pennsylvania
Education in Pittsburgh area
Education in Armstrong County, Pennsylvania
Education in Clarion County, Pennsylvania